Zhejiang University is a national public research university in Hangzhou, Zhejiang, China. It is a member of the C9 League, Double First Class University Plan, Project 985, and Project 211.

Founded as Qiushi Academy in 1897, it is the oldest university in Zhejiang and one of the oldest in China. After the 1911 Revolution, the university was shut down by the government in 1914 and was re-established as National Third Chungshan University in 1927 and renamed as National Chekiang University (NCKU) in 1928. During the presidency of Chu Kochen from 1936 to 1949, despite relocation due to World War II, the university became one of the famous four universities in China. British biochemist Joseph Needham hailed the university as "Cambridge of the East" during his visit to the university's wartime campus in Meitan, Guizhou. After the Communist Revolution, the university was renamed as Chekiang University, and was re-organized as an engineering-specialized university in 1952. In 1998, Zhejiang Medical University, Hangzhou University and Zhejiang Agricultural University, which were derived from former ZJU departments, merged into ZJU and formed the present-day ZJU as a comprehensive university. 

The university holds 7 faculties, 37 colleges, schools, and departments, offering more than 140 undergraduate and 300 graduate programs. The university also has seven affiliated hospitals, 1 museum, 2 international joint institutes, and boasts over 200 student organizations. The university is also deeply involved in and supports academic-industry collaboration and local industry innovations and development. In 2022, with a budget of 26.1 billion Chinese yuan, the university had the second largest budget in China after Tsinghua. Regarding scientific research output, the Nature Index Annual Table 2022 ranked ZJU the sixth university in China, the 7th university in the Asia Pacific region, and 11th in the world among global universities. In the fourth round of China University Subject Rankings by the Ministry of Education released in 2018, ZJU had 31 subjects rated A, the most among Chinese universities, among which 11 subjects were rated A+, the third most after Peking and Tsinghua.

Among the faculty of over 4,000 at ZJU are 52 members from the Chinese Academy of Sciences and the Chinese Academy of Engineering, 15 Distinguished Professors of Humanities, 101 Chang Jiang Scholars, and 154 recipients of the National Science Fund for Distinguished Young Scholars. Notable ZJU alumni include political leader Chen Duxiu, physicists such as Tsung-Dao Lee, Chien-Shiung Wu and Qian Sanqiang, and entrepreneurs such as Shi Yuzhu, Colin Huang and Duan Yongping.

History

Qing dynasty 

Founded by Hangzhou mayor Lin Qi as the first higher education institution in Zhejiang and one of the first of its kind in China in 1897, Qiushi Academy was the major predecessor of ZJU. Lin studied the Western higher education system and applied it to the Qiushi Academy. Due to the 1902 and 1904 education reforms in China, the Qiushi Academy was renamed to Chekiang University  in 1902, and to Chekiang Higher Institutes in 1903. Due to controversy over the new planned reform of the Institutes under the new republican government after the 1911 revolution, the Institutes stopped recruiting students since 1912, and then was closed in 1914.

Republican era 

With the nationalists coming to power after the Northern Expedition in July 1927, the provincial government of Zhejiang returned the properties of the former Chekiang Higher Institutes, with which the alumni of Chekiang and Qiushi re-established the university, with the name National Third Chungshan University , by merging Chekiang Industrial College and Chekiang Agricultural College. On April 1, 1928, the university was renamed to Chekiang University and again renamed to National Chekiang University later the year. The University of Chekiang, Chekiang University, and other English names were also used.

Jiang Menglin, who graduated from Chekiang in 1903 served as the first president of the re-established institute since July 1927, but he was appointed as the minister of education within the new nationalist government in May 1928. The presidency was soon assumed by Shao Peizi, who was a graduate of Qiushi, then a teacher at Chekiang and a major contributor to the re-establishment of Chekiang in 1927. However, despite invitation from Chiang Kai-shek, Shao refused to join Kuomintang (KMT), which worsened his relationship with the Nationalist government, eventually leading to financial crisis of the university and causing him to resign in March 1932 as the ongoing Japanese invasion in Shanghai discontinued the public funding to the university.

Soon, Cheng Tien-fong, a KMT member, was appointed as the new president. During his presidency, the university became directly funded by the central government, rather than the provincial government. Chiang also wrote a personal letter to the provincial government of Zhejiang to solve the financial issues of the university. In March 1933, Zing-Yang Kuo, a notable psychologist and also a loyal KMT member who was teaching at Chekiang, was appointed the new president. Kuo expanded university with a new campus, which later became known as the Huajiachi Campus. However, the Nationalist government became unpopular among the people with the escalation of the Sino-Japanese conflicts and the government's soft stance against invasion. During the December 9th Movement in 1935, the students expelled Kuo, accusing him for colluding with the police to arrest protesting students. As a result, Chiang Kai-shek, the head of the government, came to the university in person and eventually compromised with the students and faculty.
Chu Kochen, a scholar who had never held any political position, was recommended to Chiang Kai-shek by Chiang's speechwrite and Chekiang alumni Chen Bulei and thus became the president of Chekiang in April 1936. Chu's oath was administered by Jiang Mengling, the first president of Chekiang and then president of Peking. With strong financial support and full authority of political appointments within the university as promised by Chen Bulei, Chu Kochen thus recruited prominent figures in the Science Society of China as well as The Critical Review Group, which significantly boosted the academic reputation of Chekiang.

In the later half of 1937, the Second Sino-Japanese War broke out, and due to the invading Imperial Japanese Army, the university evacuated from Hangzhou to Yishan, Zunyi and eventually Meitan in the southwestern province of Guizhou. The students of Chekiang also carried historical collections of Zhejiang, including Siku Quanshu stored in the Wenlan Pavilion, to avoid them falling into Japanese hand. In Meitan, T. C. Hsu received postgraduate training by geneticist Tan Jiazhen, despite hardships during the war. Consistently ranked as among top 3 in the nation during that time, the National Che Kiang University was praised as one of the four most Prominent Universities in the Republic of China, along with National Central University, National Southwestern Associated University, and National Wuhan University. As the director of the Sino-British Science Co-operation Office in Chongqing, Joseph Needham visited the wartime campus of the university twice in 1944, during which he hailed the university as "Cambridge of the East."

On March 5, 1945, Fei Gong, a professor of politics at Chekiang who co-signed a declaration to call for an end to the one-party rule by Kuomintang in late February, was found missing when he was visiting Fudan University in the wartime capital Chongqing. The event later became a cause célèbre. It is generally believed that Fei was kidnapped and killed by the Nationalist government. The release of Fei and political prisoners was one of the pre-conditions that the Communists proposed to Kuomintang during the peace negotiation later the civil war. As the World War 2 ended in 1945, the university returned to Hangzhou in early 1946 and founded its own medical school according to a government order in August 1945. An affiliated hospital was set up in March 1947. As the Nationalist government took over Taiwan, Chekiang professors Luo Zongluo, Su Buqing, Chen Jiangong and Cai Zhenghua were sent to Taipei to take over and re-organise the former Taihoku Imperial University. Thus, Luo Zongluo served as the first president of the National Taiwan University after reorganization. 
The break-up of the Kuomintang-Communist coalition and peace negotiations in early 1946 was soon followed by a civil war, during which Chekiang was the Center of leftism hailed as "the fortress of democracy," due to President Chu's tolerance of leftist speech and protection for leftist students. In October 1947, Yu Zisan, the head of student union of Chekiang, was arrested for being a "communist bandit" and then died in the prison. The government's claim that Yu died of suicide was widely doubted, provoking a nationwide protest locally and nationwide, echoed by Tsinghua, Peking, Nankai, Xiamen and multiple other universities and schools in China.

People's Republic

Before re-organization 
The Communists took control of most of mainland China and formed a new government by the end of 1949. Chu resigned as the president of Chekiang, upon request by the Nationalist government, but he didn't follow the government to flee to Taiwan, despite in-person request by Chiang Ching-kuo. More than 60 of the members of Academia Sinica decided to stay in the mainland, among them all five members at Chekiang didn't leave for Taiwan. Meanwhile, a lot of Chekiang alumni went to Taiwan with the Nationalist government, including Chang Chi-yun, Tsen-cha Tsao, Kan Chia-ming, etc. In October 1950, the university was renamed as Chekiang University, removing "National" from its name, according to the order from the Ministry of Education of the new Communist government. However, the name remain in use on rare occasions, e.g. National Chekiang University Alumni Association in North America.

In 1952, the readjustment of China's tertiary education system transformed Zhejiang University from a national comprehensive university to an engineering-specialized university. Its sciences departments were sent to academic institutions including Fudan University, East China Normal University and Chinese Academy of Sciences. Its college of humanities merged with Hangchow University to form the Zhejiang Teachers College which later became Hangzhou University. Its medical school merged with Chekiang Medical College to became Zhejiang Medical University. Its agricultural and horticultural departments became an independent Zhejiang Agricultural University. Later the year, the chemical engineering departments of Zhejiang University, and some the other technological parts went to former Hangzhou Chemical Engineering School, now known as Zhejiang University of Technology. And the dean Li Shouheng, who was one of the main founders of China's modern chemical engineering, was pointed to be the first president of the new university. The division of Zhejiang University was opposed by the faculty, among which Su Buqing and Tan Jiazhen once claimed to boycott the relocation.

After re-organization 
Throughout the 1950s and 1960s, Zhejiang University was led by its Vice President Liu Dan, who chose to construct a new campus near the Laohe Hill. The campus came into use in 1956, now known as the Yuquan Campus. The former campus of Zhejiang University at Huajiachi was then used by Zhejiang Agricultural University. In the same year, as decided by Vice President Liu, Zhejiang University again started to offer sciences education in addition to the remaining engineering education, despite the prevailing Soviet influence on higher education where specialized universities are preferred. However, the Anti-Rightist Campaign and the Great Famine undermined this effort.

In March 1960, Zhejiang University's metallurgy, geology and civil engineering departments was planned to merge with Zhejiang Institute of Textile, Zhejiang Institute of Mechanical Engineering and Zhejiang Institute of Electrical Engineering to form Hangzhou College of Engineering, which was cancelled and re-merged into Zhejiang University in September 1961, except for the textile department which became Zhejiang Institute of Textile, later known as Zhejiang Sci-Tech University. The government planned to merge Hangzhou College of Engineering with a metallurgy school in Deqing, yet the Great Chinese Famine stopped the relocation plan. The institutes of Mechanical & Electrical Engineering that merged into Zhejiang University separated from Zhejiang University in 1964 to form an independent Zhejiang School of Engineering, now known as Zhejiang Institute of Mechanical & Electrical Engineering. In 1963, Zhejiang University was selected as a National Key University.

During the Cultural Revolution 
The Socialist Education Movement from 1963 to 1965 and the Cultural Revolution from 1966 to 1976 made most of Zhejiang University faculty, including Liu Dan under attack, leading to a halt of most of teaching activities. Most of the faculty were prosecuted by self-organized students during the Cultural Revolution.

During the Cultural Revolution from 1966 to 1976, the universities across China ceased to teach students due to political chaos and the national examinations were no longer held until 1977. In 1966, the students of Zhejiang University protected the Lingying Temple from being destroyed by the Red Guards who were mostly high school students in Hangzhou. The event is known as the Lingyin Temple Incident. Zhejiang University students were echoed by local villagers and Hangzhou citizens, as well as the students of Hangzhou University and Zhejiang Lu Xun Academy of Art who then joined them to protect the temple. The event ended up with a direct order from Premier Zhou Enlai to the Red Guards to protect the temple.

After the Cultural Revolution 

After the cultural revolution, Liu Dan was awarded as the honorary president of the university, the only one in the university's history. He joined three honorary presidents, i.e. Kuang Yaming of Nanjing University, Li Shusen of Tianjin University and Qu Bochuan of Dalian Institute of Technology to draft an advisory letter to the Central Committee of the Chinese Communist Party, in which they advised the government to select 50 key universities in China for national investment in higher education. The letter was approved by Deng Xiaoping, but none of the four universities was selected. During the 1980s, Liu became an active advocate for the merger of Zhejiang University, Hangzhou University, Zhejiang Agricultural University and Zhejiang Medical University after hearing from Zhejiang alumni overseas.In the mid-1980s, with the general acceptance of Hanyu Pinyin, the postal romanization of place names within the university names, became replaced by the Pinyin equivalents. Hence, Chekiang became replaced by Zhejiang while Hangchow became replaced by Hangzhou, which led to changes in the universities' English names. From 1979 to 1989, with the liberalization of China, students movements occurred, with more than 10 universities in Hangzhou participating in the movement. With the economic reforms and strong local economic development, Zhejiang University have been a major hub for entrepreneurship, which gave birth to entrepreneurs, such as Shi Yuzhu among the alumni.

In 1989, the students at Zhejiang University held demonstrations at Wulin Square, Hangzhou with more than 10 other universities in Hangzhou to support the democracy movement in Beijing. On hearing the massacre in Beijing, the protesting students blocked the railway at Nanxingqiao Railway Station with their bodies for three days, before negotiating with Vice Governor Chai Songyue. At least 60 passage trains and 166 cargo trains were blocked during the protest. Since 1988 to 1995, Lu Yongxiang assumed the president of Zhejiang University, during which he made "pursuing innovation" part of the university motto and reformed teaching and research systems, including introduction of the program of Advanced Honor Class of Engineering Education.

Merge of four universities in 1998 
The call for merger of Zhejiang University, Hangzhou University, Zhejiang Agricultural University and Zhejiang Medical University began since Zhejiang University was split in the 1950s. Major champions of the merger included the leaders of the universities, such as Liu Dan and Lu Yongxiang of Zhejiang University, Zheng Su of Zhejiang Medical University, Zhu Zuxiang of Zhejiang Agricultural University, Chen Li of Hangzhou University. In 1997, four prominent scientists who formerly worked at National Chekiang University in the 1930s and 1940s, i.e. Wang Ganchang and Bei Shizhang in Beijing, plus Su Buqing and Tan Jiazhen in Shanghai, wrote a joint letter to the then-General Secretary of the Chinese Communist Party Jiang Zemin to advise an merger of the four universities. In 1998, with the approval of the State Council, the new Zhejiang University was established as a combination of four major universities. The new Zhejiang University, with over 30,000 students and 10,000 staff was considered to be the largest higher education institution in Asia. Zhang Junsheng was appointed as the party secretary of the university to be in charge of the merger.

Present days (1998-) 
In December 2002, the Center of Mathematical Sciences was set up and headed by Fields Medalist Shing-Tung Yau. Shiing-Shen Chern and Su Buqing were honored as honorary director of the Center. In October 2003, a genomics institute was founded at the university's Zhijiang campus, named after Nobel laureate and discoverer of DNA's structure James D. Watson. In 2005, the university set up Zhejiang University Holding Group, later renamed as Zhejiang University Yuanzheng Holding Group. As of 2022, there are several companies affiliated to the group have been publicly listed, including Insigma Technology, United Mechanical & Electrical, and Shenghua Land.

In October 2005, the Hubin campus was sold at the price of 2.46 billion Chinese yuan to Kerry Properties for commercial complex development. The schools of medicine and pharmacology were relocated to Zijingang in August 2006. The "Red Building" of the campus, which was the site of the High Court of Zhejiang and the Local Court of Hang County before World War 2, was reserved and transformed into Hangzhou Urban Construction Exhibition Hall. The remaining campus buildings were demolished in January 2007. In 2010, 5 members of the Chinese People's Political Consultative Conference of Hangzhou led by its chairperson Sun Zhonghuan advised that Hangzhou Normal University be renamed as Hangzhou University, which led to objection from the alumni of Zhejiang University and former Hangzhou University.

In June 2012, Zhejiang University founded the Ocean College in collaboration with Zhoushan municipal government. The collaboration involves a new campus in Zhoushan for the new college. The college started recruiting students in 2013. The college and its first batch of students moved to the new Zhoushan campus in September 2015. The new campus is expected to accommodate 4000 students after 2025. 

In February 2013, the university decided to build an international campus domestically and an overseas campus. In June, it began to collaborate with the local government of Haining to construct a new campus as the base for international collaborations. In December 2014, the university signed an agreement with the University of Edinburgh to form a joint institute at the Haining campus. In July 2015, another agreement to build a joint institute was signed with the University of Illinois at Urbana-Champaign. In September 2016, the new Haining campus came into use, which was expected to accommodate 8000 students in the future.

In April 2013, 53 alumni co-signed a petition against the appointment of Lin Jianhua as Zhejiang University's new president. An open letter by the alumni says, "Zhejiang University needs an upright and capable academic leader, not a mediocre chief executive." In November 2013, Chu Jian, vice president of the university who was rumoured to be behind the rare petition, was arrested for bribery, yet he was not tried until 2017 and was soon released after he was sentenced to 3 years in jail which had almost been fulfilled by the time of trial. In September 2013, amid extensive objection from local Hangzhou people and Zhejiang University alumni, part of Huajiachi campus was sold at the price of 13.67 billion Chinese yuan (approximately 2.22 billion US dollars), making the land the most expensive in the city's history.

In July 2020, the university came under intense criticism for allowing an ethnic minority student convicted of rape to remain enrolled. The public questioned whether the university's decision was too lenient for sexual harassments. The overwhelming public opinions made the university review the case, and eventually expelled the student.

In November 2020, the university founded its new Ningbo campus, where the School of Software Technology and the Polytechnic Institute of the university offers postgraduate education. The Ningbo Institute of Technology, which used to be an ZJU affiliated independent technical college, was transformed into NingboTech University that is independent from ZJU, but remains in the Ningbo campus of ZJU. In 2019, the Institute of Hainan were founded in Sanya, Hainan. In 2021, new institutes were founded in Quzhou, Jinhua, Wenzhou, Jiaxing, Huzhou, Shaoxing and Taizhou within Zhejiang. In March 2021, tech tycoon Colin Huang donated $100 million to support the university's Shanghai Institute for Advanced Study.

Campuses

Current campuses 
With seven campuses, namely Zijingang, Yuquan, Xixi, Huajiachi, Zhijiang, Zhoushan, International campus in Haining and Ningbo, Zhejiang University encompasses an area of 6.22 square kilometers with school buildings covering 3.67 million square meters of floor space.

Zijingang Campus 

Zijingang campus serves as the main campus of Zhejiang University and is located in the northwest of Hangzhou. There are two libraries in the campus, i.e. the Basic Library next to the east gate and the Library of Agriculture and Medicine in the southeast corner and Library of Ancient Books in the south of the campus. The first floor of the Basic Library is an English corner every Tuesday and Thursday night. The campus is served by Sanba Station and Xialongwei Station of the Hangzhou Metro to the east of the campus and Zijingang Campus Zhejiang University Station on the south side. 

The South Gate of the campus is linked to the Zijingang Campus Zhejiang University station with bridges over the Yuhangtang River, which were opened in February 2022. The gigantic, five-arched South Gate was built with donations from alumni, but widely regarded unfit for the purpose among ZJU students. In a public poll in 2021, the South Gate was voted as the ugliest building in China.

Zijingang Campus boasts a large assortment of academic departments and schools, including College of Media and International Culture, School of International Studies, School of Art and Archaeology, School of Economics, College of Education, College of Pharmaceutical Sciences, School of Medicine, College of Chemical and Biomedical Engineering, College of Biosystems Engineering and Food Science, College of Animal Sciences, College of Life Sciences, College of Civil Engineering and Architecture, College of Environmental and Resource Sciences, School of Management, and School of Public Affairs etc.

Yuquan Campus 

Yuquan campus is the campus of engineering, computer science, and the physical sciences. Most students at the Yuquan campus are graduate students within these academic disciplines. The Yuquan campus was the main campus of Zhejiang University until the Zijingang campus was built in 2002. The campus is served by the Gudang and Huanglong Sports Center stations of the Hangzhou Metro.

Zheda Road that stretches from the main gate of the campus to the High School Attached to Zhejiang University was known for its road greening landscape design. Alongside the road is a compound named Zheda Qiushi Village, also known as Qiushi Village, which was the residential area for Zhejiang University faculty and their family. Qiushi Primary School, also known as the Primary School Attached to Zhejiang University, and Hangzhou No. 15 Middle School, also known as the Junior High School Attached to Zhejiang University, are located near the compound. The Yuquan 1897 cafe within the campus is an English corner every Wednesday evening.

Xixi Campus 

Xixi campus was previously the site of the former Hangzhou University before it merged into Zhejiang University in 1998. The campus hosts Department of Psychology and Behavioral Sciences, School of Art and Archaeology, and Zhejiang University Press. The library is located in the Center of campus. Between the library and the south gate of the campus is a large meadow. The campus is next to Xuejun High School. Xuejun used to be the affiliated high school of Hangzhou University, and is among top two high schools in Hangzhou, hence a major source of students admitted into Zhejiang University. Due to the location, the university canteen at Xixi was often overloaded with high school students.

Huajiachi Campus 

The Huajiachi campus was previously Zhejiang Agricultural University before merging with Zhejiang University and served as the old Huajiachi Campus for the National Chekiang University before the early 1950s. The campus is home to the departments of dentistry and agriculture, plus the College of Continuing Education. The Huajiachi campus is Zhejiang University's oldest campus. The Huajiachi initially refers to a lake within the campus, hence the name of the campus. The library is located on the east shore of the Huajiachi. The university made a plan to move out from the campus in 2007. As part of the plan, one fourth of the campus had been sold in 2013. In the plan, the campus will be transformed into a lakeside park that reserves most of the campus' old buildings.

Zhijiang Campus 

The Zhijiang campus is home to Guanghua Law School. Before being acquired by Zhejiang University in 1952, the Zhijiang campus served as the main campus of Hangchow University, and is located on the Yuelun Hill next to the Qiantang River and the Liuhe Pagoda. The campus is now home to James D. Watson Institute of Genome Sciences, Guanghua Law School and the Institute for Advanced Study in Humanities and Social Sciences. The Library of Guanghua Law School is located to the north of the Main Teaching Building. Several buildings in the campus are listed as the Major Historical and Cultural Sites Protected at the National Level. The 2010 movie Aftershock made the campus a popular tourist destination within the city, as the movie was shot on location within the campus to mimic a Chinese university life in the 1980s.

Zhoushan Campus 
Zhoushan campus is a campus that opened in 2015 and serves as the campus for the Ocean College. It is located in Lincheng, Dinghai District, Zhoushan City on the Zhoushan Island. The Library of the Ocean College is located in the north of the campus. Between the library and the south gate is a meadow. The university's only training ship, named Zijingang, is deployed at the campus. Only third-year and fourth-year undergraduate students of the Ocean College and postgraduate students studied at the campus, while first-year and second-year students of the college receive education at Zijingang before moving to the campus in their third year.

Haining International Campus 

Haining International Campus is located in the Zhejiang city of Haining. Clusters of international cooperative partners and institutions reside at this campus, which opened in 2016 as part of Zhejiang University. Student studying at the campus are also enrolled in the residential college. The first master of the college is Professor Lap-Chee Tsui. The International Campus Library is a three-storey octagonal building located on the northeast shore of the central lake of the campus. The campus is served by International Campus, ZJU station of Hangzhou–Haining intercity railway, which opened on 28 June 2021.

Zhejiang University International Business School (ZIBS), the Zhejiang University-University of Edinburgh Institute (ZJE), the Zhejiang University-University of Illinois at Urbana-Champaign Institute (ZJUI) and the Imperial College-Zhejiang University Joint Applied Data Science Lab are located within the campus.

Ningbo Campus 

The Ningbo campus was initiated as a collaboration with Ningbo city government in September 2017, with the campus' administration founded in September 2019. It was based on the campus of the former Ningbo Institute of Technology (NIT) of Zhejiang University (now NingboTech University). Zhejiang University library has not set up a branch library in the campus, yet its resources are available at NingboTech's library. The campus is served by South Higher Education Park Station of Ningbo Rail Transit. The Polytechnic Institute of Zhejiang University started a branch in the campus since October 2016. Later, the Institute of Ningbo was founded in June 2018 within the campus of Ningbo Institute of Technology (NIT), Zhejiang University. In January 2020, the NIT was made independent from Zhejiang University and renamed as NingboTech University, but remains in the campus. The campus is also home to the School of Software Technology, Zhejiang University.

Off-campus research Centers 
The university also has several research institutes off its campuses within Zhejiang, which include the Innovation Institute for Artificial Intelligence in Medicine, Zhejiang University Innovation Institute International, Innovative Institute of Basic Medical Sciences of Zhejiang University in Hangzhou, the Institute of Wenzhou, Research Institute of Zhejiang University - Taizhou, Institute of Quzhou, Institute of Jinhua, Institute of Huzhou, International Institutes of Medicine in Yiwu, the Institute of Shaoxing, and the Ocean Research Center of Zhoushan.

The institutes and research Centers outside the province include the Institute of State System Research (Beijing Research Center), Shanghai Institute for Advanced Study, Hainan Institute of Zhejiang University, the Institute of Shenzhen, Suzhou Industrial Technology Research Institute, and Changzhou Industrial Technology Research Institute, and Zhongyuan Institute in Zhengzhou.

Historical and proposed campuses

Wartime Campuses 
During the World War 2, the university left its campus in Hangzhou to evade Japanese invasion. During the wartime relocation, the university also temporarily used the campuses in Jiande in 1937, Ji'an, Taihe Yishan in 1938, before it finally arrived in Meitan and Zunyi, Guizhou in southwest China in early 1940. The university operated there for seven years until the war ended. In June 1939, the university set up a satellite campus headed by Zheng Xiaocang in Longquan, Zhejiang.

In 2016, Dr. Ye Yongfei of the central committee of the Revolutionary Committee of the Chinese Kuomintang suggest that the university restore the Meitan campus to support economic development in western China, which was echoed by the local government of Zunyi who set up a committee to gather support in 2018. In March 2018, the university responded that it had no substantial plan to restore the Meitan campus.

Former Hubin Campus 

The university had a Hubin campus, which was the former site of Zhejiang Medical University. Most of the campus was demolished in January 2007 and turned into the Kerry Center, a modern commercial complex connected with Fengqi Road station of Hangzhou Metro, except for the former site of the High Court of Zhejiang and the Local Court of Hang County reserved as Hangzhou Urban Construction Exhibition Hall.

University identity and culture

Motto 
During the University Council meeting held in Yishan, Guangxi on 19 November 1938, "seeking truth" was made the motto of the university, upon President Chu Kochen's advice. Qiushi is an excerpt of the famous quote in Yangmingism, "A Gentleman learns only to know what is right."  It was made the name of the former body Qiushi Academy in 1897, which means seeking truth and has the same pronunciation as truth in English. According to Chu, 

In May 1988, "pursuing innovation" was added to the university motto by the university council, to adapt the motto to the times of reforms and opening up. President Lu Yongxiang explained in 1992,

Anthem 

During the 19 November 1938 university council meeting, the neo-Confucianism scholar Ma Yifu, who was teaching at Chekiang was invited by President Chu to be the lyric writer of the university anthem, upon Chu's advice. However, as the lyric by Ma was written in Classical Chinese and thus difficult-to-understand, the anthem wasn't composed until Professor Ying Shangneng at National Conservatory of Music was invited to compose the anthem in the summer of 1941. In 2014, the Zhejiang University Anthem was ranked the most popular university anthem, according to an online survey by the news office of the Ministry of Education.

Mascot, logo and flag 

The university's mascot is Qiushi eagle, which was first portrayed within its seal used by National Chekiang University during the 1920s and 1930s and then reintroduced in the 1990 logo of Zhejiang University. The Qiushi eagle also appears in the logos of NingboTech University and Zhejiang University City College, which was formerly affiliated institutions of Zhejiang University turned independent in December 2019.

The current logo of Zhejiang University was introduced by the university council meeting in January 1991. The logo was officially digitized in May 2017. The Chinese character calligraphy in the logo is taken from Mao Zedong's writing. A combination of the calligraphy and logo in red or blue if using a blank flag or in white if using a blue or red flag is used as the flags of the university.

Quotes of Chu Kochen 
Chu Kochen, who served as the president of National Chekiang University from 1936 to 1949, is credited with a major impact on the guiding spirit of Zhejiang University. His two open questions for the freshmen who enrolled in 1936 has been inscribed in the stone next to the main gate of the Zijingang Campus as well as multiple sites within the university, which says,

In another quote that is often displayed in the campus, Chu Kochen talks about the aim of university education, where he says,

Administration and organization

Governance 
The university is organized according to Zhejiang University Chapter approved by the Ministry of Education of the People's Republic of China. The current chapter was approved in September 2014. According to the chapter, the university is a national university managed by the Ministry of Education and jointly funded by the central government and Zhejiang government. The university is operated by the Communist Party Committee of the university with the president taking the responsibility of decision making. The committee is required to ensure rule of law, academic freedom and democracy at the university. Since 2000, the president and party secretary of the university are appointed by the Organization Department of the Chinese Communist Party, and the appointees are automatically considered as vice-ministerial level officials. The party committee elects the members of the standing committee, which decide major issues at the university jointly with the party committee. The president hosts university council meeting to decide on teaching and learning, scientific research and administrative issues. The faculty can review and advise on university decisions via the faculty representative meeting. The current party secretary of the university is Dr. Ren Shaobo. The president of the university is Professor Dr. Wu Zhaohui.

Administrative departments 
In the university has an administrative system that consists of 17 administrative departments. Among them, the Office of the Presidents set the strategic priorities for the university to maintain the university's leading position, while the Development and Planning Office is in charge of planning for the implementation of the strategic priorities. The Office of Global Engagement and the Division of Domestic Relations are responsible for implementing the university's strategy and promoting the university domestically and globally. The Human Resources Department recruits and provides services for the faculty, while the Undergraduate School and the Graduate School organise and supervise teaching, learning and degree awarding. The Administration of Continuing Education further provides training and supervision for continuing education programs. The research and development programs are supervised by the Sci-Tech Academy and the Academy of Humanities and Social Sciences, depending on the subject. The university research facilities and device are purchased, maintained, and evaluated by the Office of Laboratory and Equipment Management. The Department of General Affairs and the Office of Capital Construction are responsible for the management and construction of the university properties. The Medical Management Office manages the affiliated hospitals.

Academic Structure 

The academic disciplines at the university are divided into seven faculties, which each has different schools. Each faculty, school and department has its own academic committee and different rules of procedures. The committee is organized by the faculty, with a restriction on the percentage of people who serve administrative roles. Selection of the members are based on recommendations within the faculty. The university is a key comprehensive university whose fields of study cover eleven branches of learning, namely philosophy, literature, history, education, science, economics, law, management, engineering, agriculture, and medicine. Below is the list of academic faculties, schools and colleges of the university:

Faculty of Arts and Humanities 

 School of Humanities
 School of International Studies
 College of Media and International Culture
 School of Art and Archaeology

Faculty of Social Sciences 

 School of Economics
 Guanghua Law School
 College of Education
 School of Management
 School of Public Affairs
 School of Marxism

Faculty of Science 
The Faculty of Science was a combination of the sciences departments at Hangzhou University and Zhejiang University

 School of Mathematical Sciences
 Department of Physics
 Department of Chemistry
 School of Earth Sciences
 Department of Psychology and Behavioral Sciences

Faculty of Engineering 

 School of Mechanical Engineering
 School of Material Science and Engineering
 College of Energy Engineering
 College of Electrical Engineering
 College of Civil Engineering and Architecture
 College of Chemical and Biological Engineering
 Ocean College
 School of Aeronautics and Astronautics
 Department of Polymer Science and Engineering

Faculty of Information 
The Faculty of Information consists of most key departments of Zhejiang University before the 1998 merger. The School of Software Technology was founded in 2001 and is located in both Hangzhou and Ningbo. Entry into the College of Computer Science and Technology is considered to be one of the most competitive in China. Its computer science department specialises in computer graphics, computer vision, and artificial intelligence, which are the computer science domains where Zhejiang University is ranked among top 5 worldwide according to CSranking. In the fourth round of CUSR, among the subjects that the faculty offers,  Optical Engineering, Control Science and engineering, Computer Science and technology, and Software Engineering were rated A+, and Biomedical Engineering was rated A-.

 College of Optical Science and Engineering
 College of Information Science and Electronic Engineering
 College of Control Science and Engineering
 College of Computer Science and Technology
 School of Software Technology
 College of Biomedical Engineering and Instrument Science

Faculty of Agriculture, Life and Environment Science 
The Faculty of Agriculture, Life and Environment Science (FALE) consists of most departments of Zhejiang Agricultural University before the 1998 merger. In the fourth round of CUSR, among the subjects that the faculty offers, Agricultural Engineering,  Horticulture, Agricultural Resources and environment, and Plant protection wer rated A+, Environmental Science and Engineering, and Pharmacy were rated A, Food Science and engineering,  Crop Science, Animal Science were rated A-. It has the most subjects rated A-/A/A+ across all faculties at the university.

 College of Life Sciences
 College of Biosystem Engineering and Food Science
 College of Environmental and Resource Sciences
 College of Agriculture and Biotechnology
 College of Animal Sciences

Faculty of Medicine 
The Faculty of Medicine consists of most departments of Zhejiang Medical University before the 1998 merger, with their roots dating back to Chekiang Provincial Medical School founded in 1912, the Pharmaceutical Department of National Chekiang University founded in 1944 and the Medical School of National Chekiang University founded in 1945. The faculty used to be based at Hubin Campus until it is relocated to Zijingang in 2007. The School of Medicine is also among the 45 Chinese medical schools to offer English teaching Bachelor of Medicine and Bachelor of Surgery (MBBS) programs. It also recruits medical doctoral students from prestigious Chu Kochen Honors College in a program named Ba Denian Medical Program. The School of Basic Medical Sciences offers a joint undergraduate programs in biomedicine and bioinformatics at International Campus. Under the School of Medicine, there are seven top-level hospitals. In the fourth round of CUSR, its clinical medicine, pharmacy and basic medicine are rated A+, A and A-, respectively.

 College of Pharmaceutical Sciences
 School of Medicine
Under the School of Medicine, there are seven affiliated hospitals, including: 
First Affiliated Hospital (as the first teaching hospital)
 Second Affiliated Hospital (as the second teaching hospital)
 Sir Run Run Shaw Hospital (as the third teaching hospital)
 Fourth Affiliated Hospital (also called Yiwu Hospital, as the fourth teaching hospital)
 Women's Hospital
 Children's Hospital
 Stomatology Hospital (also called Zhejiang Provincial Stomatology Hospital)

Finances 
According to the University Chapter, the university is largely funded by the government. The university has been selected into several national plans to nurture world-class universities, including Double First Class University Plan, Project 985 and Project 211. In 2022, with a budget of 26.1 billion Chinese yuan, the university had the second largest budget in China after Tsinghua. The university also raises money through income from its affiliations, government subsidy, donations and other legal sources of income. Zhejiang University consistently stands among top receivers of alumni donations in China. In 2021, it received 2.38 billion Chinese yuan, the fourth most after Tsinghua, Peking and Wuhan. On September 21, 2006, Chinese billionaires Duan Yongping (Zhejiang University alumnus) and Ding Lei (Zhejiang native) donated together a one-time endowment of 40 million US dollars to Zhejiang University. US$30 million was from Duan with 10 million from Ding. It was the largest private one-off endowment to a university in Mainland China. In 2017, the university received a donation of 1.1 billion Chinese yuan (circa.160 million US dollars), again breaking the record for highest alumni donation.

Academics

Teaching and learning 
The academic departments are responsible for teaching and assessments of various courses and draft the details of degree programs, which needs to be approved by the Undergraduate and Graduate Schools before start; the detailed method may differ according to the course and the program. Teaching is supervised and regulated by the Undergraduate School and the Graduate School for quality control. Chu Kochen Honors College (CKC), named after the university's former president Chu Kochen, is an elite undergraduate college of ZJU, which further select students from top students at ZJU or in Gaokao. Teaching at Chu Kochen Honors College and international dual degree programs at Haining are supervised and regulated by their own responsible committees.

Degree awarding is based on academic credits requirement for compulsory and elective courses, which a student must both fulfill to graduate. To earn academic credits, the student can choose and pass a combination of courses at his or her will, as long as the course is available for enrolment, yet some courses may be competitive for enrolment due to class size limits.

Qiushi College 
Qiushi College was founded in July 2008, as a residential college and part of the School of Undergraduate. It managed the student dormitories including the Danyang-Qingxi Hall, the Ziyun-Bifeng Hall, and the Lantian Hall. It offers liberal arts education for freshmen and supports student organizations and activities. It also provides students with aids for academic affairs such as college major choices and team building. Upon enrolment into the university, undergraduates join a hall of Qiushi College at Zijingang mostly according to their faculties of study. In the student military training and education for all Chinese national freshmen, the students are organized according to their halls within the college. In the first year of study, the major of the student may be unspecified as they are recruited according to academic faculties rather than specific academic subjects. They are considered to be a student of the Hall but not of an academic department then. The student may later apply to study a major later or transfer to another major during the study, yet the application to popular majors are highly competitive and additional requirements may apply. The college is responsible for providing assistance to the student.

Chu Kochen Honors College 
Chu Kochen Honors College (CKHC) was founded in May 2000 in honour of Chu Kochen, a former president of the university and is typically chaired by the current president of Zhejiang University. Its predecessor the Mixed Class of Engineering was launched in 1984. It offers a collection of programs including the Experimental Class of Engineering, the Mixed Class, the Experimental Class of Humanities and Social Sciences, the Qiushi Sciences Class, the Experimental Class of Medicine, the Shennong Class. Entry into the college is highly selective and competitive and its selection questions are known to be creative but difficult. Notable alumni of the college include entrepreneur Colin Huang and the current president of Zhejiang University Wu Zhaohui. Its teaching and learning are supervised by a special committee headed by the president. During the program, 15-20 percentile of the CKHC students in term of GPA will be transferred to non-CKHC programs.

International Campus 
The dual degree programs at the International Campus are supervised and regulated by the joint institute to fulfill academic requirements of both Zhejiang University and the partner institutes. For example, the University of Edinburgh regulations on progression and degree classification also applies to its joint institute at the campus, although they are not part of Zhejiang University regulations. The campus only provides a limited number of elective courses and allows students to elect a course that is not offered at his or her own institute. However, transfer from a Sino-foreign program to a purely ZJU program or between two programs of different joint institutes are not allowed. Transfer within the joint institute is allowed, yet its approval may be subject to the class size.

Research
Zhejiang University is a comprehensive research university. Research at Zhejiang University spans 12 academic disciplines: agriculture, art, economics, education, engineering, history, law, literature, management, medicine, natural sciences, and philosophy.

Among its approximate 4,191 standing faculty members, more than 1,893 faculty members hold the title of professor. The faculty includes: 26 members of the Chinese Academy of Sciences, 27 members of the Chinese Academy of Engineering, 164 Chang Jiang (Yangtze River) Award winners, and 154 recipients of the awards from the National Science Fund for Distinguished Young Scholars. Zhejiang University also has prominent foreign faculty members. Zhejiang University has 11 State Key Laboratories, as one of the universities with most SKLs in China, which include:

 Rice Biology, State Key Lab of
 Chemical Engineering, State Key Lab of
 Modern Optical Instrumentation, State Key Lab of
 Industrial Control Technology, State Key Lab of
 Fluid Power Transmission and Control, State Key Lab of
 CAD and Computer Graphics, State Key Lab of
 Diagnosis and Treatment of Infectious Diseases, State Key Lab of
 Clean Energy Utilization, State Key Lab of
 Silicon Materials, State Key Lab of
 Plant Physiology and Biochemistry, State Key Lab of
 Modern Optical Instrumentation, State Key Lab of

The university also has three State Specialized Labs, including the State Specialized Lab of Secondary Resources Chemical Engineering, the State Specialized Lab of Power Electronics, and the State Specialized Lab of Biomedical Sensor. Besides, the university has three labs of the Ministry of Education (MOE), including the MOE Key Lab of Soft Soils and Geoenvironmental Engineering, the MOE Key Lab of Conservation Genetics and Reproductive Biology for Endangered Wildlife and the MOE-Microsoft Key Lab of Visual Perception.

Library system 
The library system has a total library collection of more than 7.9 million volumes, which is one of China's largest academic collections. The system has 6 branch libraries, namely Yuquan Campus Library, Basic Library of Zijingang Campus, Library of Agriculture and Medicine of Zijingang Campus, Library of Ancient Books of Zijingang Campus, Xixi Campus Library and Hujiachi Campus Library, plus 3 branch libraries within different colleges, namely Guanghua Law School Library, International Campus Library, Ocean College Library. Zijingang Campus is the only campus to have three library. One can reserve a book at any library for collection of a book that may belong to another library in the system.

Rankings and reputation

General rankings 
Zhejiang University is consistently ranked among the top universities in China and the Asia-Pacific according to major international university rankings.

As of 2022, the QS World University Rankings ranked Zhejiang University 42nd in the world and 5th in Asia. The Academic Ranking of World Universities, also known as the "Shanghai Ranking", placed Zhejiang University 36th in the world, 5th in the whole of Asia & Oceania region and 3rd in China after (Tsinghua and Peking). Zhejiang University was among the top 50 most reputation universities in the world by the Times Higher Education World Reputation Rankings.

Research performance 
As of 2021, it was ranked tenth among universities around the world by SCImago Institutions Rankings. The 2022 CWTS Leiden Ranking ranked Zhejiang University 16th globally and 2nd in Asia after Tsinghua, based on the number of their scientific publications belonging to the top 1% in their fields for the time period 2017–2020. Regarding scientific research output, the Nature Index Annual Table 2022 ranked ZJU the sixth university in China, the 7th university in the Asia Pacific region, and 11th in the world among the global universities.

Subjects rankings 
In the Essential Science Indicator (ESI) rankings of 22 disciplines, Zhejiang University ranks among the top 1% in 15 disciplines and is listed in the top 100 of the world's academic institutions in 4 disciplines. As of 2021, the U.S. News & World Report placed "Agricultural Sciences", "Biotechnology and Applied Microbiology", "Chemical Engineering", "Chemistry", "Civil Engineering", "Computer Science", "Condensed Matter Physics", "Electrical and Electronic Engineering", "Energy and Fuels", "Engineering", "Food Science and Technology", "Material Science", "Mechanical Engineering", "Nanoscience and Nanotechnology", "Optics", "Physical Chemistry", "Pharmacology and Toxicology", "Plant and Animal Science" and "Polymer Science" at Zhejiang University in the global Top 50 universities. In the fourth round of China University Subject Rankings by the Ministry of Education released in 2018, ZJU had 31 subjects rated A, the most among Chinese universities, among which 11 subjects were rated A+, the third most after Peking and Tsinghua. Below is the list of A+/A/A- subjects of ZJU.

Student life

Student body
In 2020, there were a total of 60,739 full-time students enrolled at Zhejiang University, including 29,209 undergraduates, 18,046 master's candidates and 13,485 doctoral candidates. In 2020, there were 5,596 international students studying at Zhejiang University.

CC98 forum 

CC98 is a student-run forum. It was created in December 2002. It can be accessed by visiting www.cc98.org on the school intranet. It consists of categorical boards for discussion on various topics. As of March 2023, the forum is available only in Chinese.

Notable people

Students
See List of Zhejiang University alumni

 Chen Tianhua - Qiushi Academy and the member of Chinese United League and reporter of The People's Daily
 Chen Duxiu – the co-founder, the first General Secretary and first Chairman of Chinese Communist Party
 Xie Xuren – Minister of Finance of the People's Republic of China
 Hu Qiaomu – the first President of Chinese Academy of Social Sciences, President of Xinhua News Agency
 Huang Fu – President and Premier of the Republic of China
 Jiang Menglin – Minister of Education (1928–1930) of the Republic of China
 Chen Yi – Chief Executive and Garrison Commander of Taiwan
 Zhang Xinsheng – Chairman of UNESCO's Executive Board
 Ye Duzheng – meteorologist, State Preeminent Science and Technology Award winner 2005
 Xu Guangxian – chemist, State Preeminent Science and Technology Award winner 2009
 Hsiao-Lan Kuo – meteorologist, Carl-Gustaf Rossby Research Medal winner 1970
 Xie Xuejing – geochemist, AAG Gold Medal winner 2007
 Lin Fanghua – mathematician, Bôcher Memorial Prize winner 2002
 Hu Hesheng – mathematician, Noether Lecturer 2002
 Xu-Jia Wang – mathematician, Australian Mathematical Society Medal winner 2002
 T. Tony Cai – statistician, COPSS Presidents' Award winner 2008
 Tsung-Dao Lee – physicist, Nobel Prize laureate (physics, 1957)
 Chien-Shiung Wu – physicist, Wolf Prize laureate (physics, 1978)
 Xu Liangying – physicist, Andrei Sakharov Prize recipient 2008
 Chen Hang – horticulturist, Veitch Memorial Medal winner 1990
 Kun-Liang Guan – biochemist, MacArthur Award winner 1998
 Tao-Chiuh Hsu – biologist, the 13th President of American Society for Cell Biology
 Yao Zhen – biologist, the first President of Asian-Pacific Organization for Cell Biology
 Qiu Fazu – surgeon, Bundesverdienstkreuz recipient 1985
 Wu Guanzhong – painter, Ordre des Arts et des Lettres recipient 1991
 Lu Yongxiang – President of Chinese Academy of Science
 Ding Zhongli – Vice-president of Chinese Academy of Science
 Pan Yunhe – Vice-president of Chinese Academy of Engineering
 Pan Jiazheng – Vice-president of Chinese Academy of Engineering
 Wang Xufeng – writer, Mao Dun Literature Prize winner 2000
 Min Zhu – co-founder and former president and CTO of WebEx
 Cha Chi Ming – industrialist, entrepreneur, philanthropist, Grand Bauhinia Medal winner 1997
 Zhu Yanfeng – President of First Automobile Works
 Wang Jianzhou – Chairman & CEO of China Mobile
 Wang Tianpu – President of Sinopec
 Shi Zhengrong – Founder & CEO of Suntech Power
 Zhu Qinan – shooter, 10 m Air Rifle olympic champion, 2004 Athens
 Zhou Suhong – volleyball player, 2003 World Cup and 2004 Athens Olympic Games team champion.

Faculty 

 Hailan Hu - laureate of the 2022 L'Oréal-UNESCO for Women in Science International Award
 Shing-Tung Yau – Fields Medalist, founder and director of the Center of Mathematical Sciences, Zhejiang University
 Shiing-Shen Chern – Wolf Prize laureate, former director and advisor of the Center of Mathematical Sciences
 Chien-Shiung Wu – Wolf Prize laureate
 Ren Mei'e – Victoria Medal winner 1986, former professor and dean of the Department of Geology
 Wu Wenjun – Shaw Prize laureate 2006, former teacher of Hangzhou University
 Liu Chen – Hannes Alfvén Prize recipient 2008, professor and director
 Su Buqing - mathematician, co-founder of Chen-Su School, former dean of the Department of Mathematics, former provost of Zhejiang University
 Chen Jiangong - mathematician, co-founder of Chen-Su School, former dean of the Department of Mathematics
 Bei Shizhang – biologist, former co-founder and professor of the Department of Biology
 Tan Jiazhen – geneticist, former professor of the Department of Biology, former dean of the College of Science
 Chang Chi-yun – historian, geologist, politician
 Coching Chu – meteorologist, geologist, former president of Zhejiang University
 Ma Yinchu - economist, former president of Zhejiang University
 Jiang Menglin – educator， former president of Zhejiang University
 Jin Au Kong – Electromagnetist, founder and former president of the Electromagnetics Academy
 Jin Yong – novelist, former dean of the Faculty of Arts and Humanities
 Qian Sanqiang – physicist
 Kan-Chang Wang – physicist, discover of the Sigma baryon, proposed neutrino detection which led to neutrino discovery, former dean of the Department of Physics
 Xia Yan – playwright, screenwriter

See also 

 Qiushi Academy, Hangchow University, Hangzhou University, Zhejiang Agricultural University and Zhejiang Medical University
 C9 League, Education in China, and Higher Education in China

Notes

References

External links

 Zhejiang University Home Page 

 
Universities and colleges in Hangzhou
Project 211
Project 985
Plan 111
Educational institutions established in 1897
Universities in China with English-medium medical schools
1897 establishments in China
C9 League
Vice-ministerial universities in China
Universities established in the 20th century